Mario Esposito may refer to:
 Mario Esposito (scholar)
 Mario Esposito (archer)